Samson and Goliath are the twin shipbuilding gantry cranes situated at Queen's Island, Belfast, Northern Ireland. The cranes, which were named after the Biblical figures Samson and Goliath, dominate the Belfast skyline and are landmark structures of the city.  Comparative newcomers to the city, the cranes rapidly came to symbolise Belfast in a way that no  building or monument had hitherto done.

History
The cranes are situated in the Harland & Wolff shipyard on the east side of Belfast Lough. They were made by the German engineering firm Krupp and transported to Belfast. Goliath was erected in 1969 and Samson in 1974.

Goliath, sits further inland, closer to the city.

Lifting capacity
Their combined lifting capacity of almost 1,700 tonnes is one of the largest in the world.

Harland & Wolff
At its height Harland & Wolff boasted 35,000 employees and a healthy order book, but in the years following the cranes' construction the workforce and business declined. The last ship to be launched at the yard to date was a roll-on/roll-off ferry in March 2003. Since then the yard has restructured itself to focus less on shipbuilding and more on design and structural engineering, as well as ship repair, offshore construction projects and competing for other projects to do with metal engineering and construction. Initially there was concern that the now largely redundant cranes would be demolished. However, later in the year they were scheduled as historic monuments under Article 3 of the Historic Monuments and Archaeological Objects (Northern Ireland) Order 1995.

Northern Ireland Office Minister of the time Angela Smith stated: "These cranes are an essential part of our city, our roots and our culture."

The cranes are not, technically, ‘listed buildings’, but are recognised by the Northern Ireland Environment Agency as buildings of ‘architectural or historic interest’.

Shipbuilding has ceased in Belfast, but the cranes are to be retained as part of the existing dry dock facility within the restructured shipyard, situated adjacent to the Titanic Quarter, a business, light industrial, leisure and residential development on land now surplus to the heavy industrial requirements of the shipyard on Queen's Island.  They were still (2015) kept in working order and used for heavy lifting by Harland & Wolff in its other activities, however the company ceased trading in 2019.

Recent history
On 4 April 2007, Samson crashed into the long jib of smaller rail-mounted "Henson" tower crane, sending the smaller crane tumbling to the ground. The smaller crane weighed 95 tonnes and stood at a height of 25 m, compared to Samson's 106 m.  Three industrial painters working on another rail-mounted crane were close to the jib as it fell, eventually crashing onto the ground. Information about the incident was not released until mobile-phone footage of the event was published on YouTube.

In October 2007, Goliath re-entered service after five years, an occurrence described by a company spokesman as underlining the yard's growing workload.

First shown in February 2021, Goliath appears repeatedly as part of series 1 of BBC One’s drama Bloodlands, with postcards of the crane a key clue in the murder investigation.

See also

Notes and references

External links

Titanic Quarter

Buildings and structures in Belfast
Individual cranes (machines)
Shipyard cranes
Goliath cranes